Seeing Red or Seein' Red may refer to:

Music
Seeing Red (album), an album by LiveonRelease
"Seein' Red" (Unwritten Law song), 2002
"Seein' Red" (Dustin Lynch song), 2016
"Seeing Red", a 1981 song by Minor Threat from First Two 7"s on a 12"
"Seeing Red", a song by Killing Joke from the album Killing Joke (2003 album)
Seein' Red, a fastcore band formed by some members of Lärm

Film
Seeing Red (1983 film), a documentary film
Seeing Red (1992 film), an Australian film
Seeing Red (2000 film), a British film featuring Jonny Clarke

Television
"Seeing Red" (Arrow), an episode of Arrow
"Seeing Red" (Buffy the Vampire Slayer), a 2002 episode of Buffy the Vampire Slayer
"Seeing Red" (CSI: Miami), an episode of CSI: Miami
"Seeing Red" (Dexter), an episode of Dexter
"Seeing Red" (The Flash), an episode of The Flash
"Seeing Red" (Foster's Home for Imaginary Friends), a 2004 episode of Foster's Home for Imaginary Friends
"Seeing Red" (The Mentalist), an episode of The Mentalist
"Seeing Red" (Ms. Marvel), a 2022 episode of Ms. Marvel
"Seeing Red" (Wentworth), an episode of Wentworth
Hollyoaks: Seeing Red, a book about the TV series Hollyoaks

See also
Seeing Redd, a 2007 fantasy novel about Alice in Wonderland by Frank Beddor
"Saw Red", a song by Sublime from their 1994 album Robbin' the Hood